Be Melodramatic is a 2019 South Korean television series starring Chun Woo-hee, Jeon Yeo-been, Han Ji Eun and Gong Myung. It aired on cable network JTBC on Fridays and Saturdays at 20:30  from August 9 to September 28, 2019.

Synopsis
A romantic comedy that depicts the daily lives of 30-year-old best friends Lim Jin-joo (Chun Woo-hee), Lee Eun-jung (Jeon Yeo-been) and Hwang Han-joo (Han Ji-eun), using a show within a show as the backdrop.

Jin-joo is a writer who gets her first chance to write a 16-episode television series and, in the process, falls for her director, Son Beom Soo (Ahn Jae-hong), and he for her, although not without a number of prickly moments.  As Jin-joo writes the show and Beom-soo develops it, their personal and professional lives intertwine in unexpected ways.

Eun-jung is a documentary film maker who has not properly got over the early death of her fiance from cancer.  But she is successful professionally.  During much of the series, she is making a documentary about a second-tier actress and personality, Lee So Min (Lee Joo-bin), who ends up being considered for a role in Jin-joo and Beom-soo's show.

Han-joo is a single mother who works for a marketing and production company. One of her jobs is to ensure that production companies that have accepted product placements by her company live up to their commitments, a responsibility she executes inventively. She gets promoted and her company ends up working on Jin-joo and Beom-soo's show.

The show features a large ensemble cast and follows the story arcs of many of them.

Cast

Main
 Chun Woo-hee as Lim Jin-joo
A rookie drama screenwriter. She broke up with Kim Hwan-dong after dating him for seven years.
 Jeon Yeo-been as Lee Eun-jung
A documentary director who is the CEO and only employee of her company. She has persistent complex grief disorder after her boyfriend passed away and often imagines and talks with him.
 Han Ji-eun as Hwang Han-joo
The marketing team leader of a drama production company. She's also a single mother.
 Ahn Jae-hong as Son Beom-soo
A famous drama director who has filmed five consecutive hits, who combines arrogance and insecurity. He decides to make Jin-joo's proposed 16-episode romantic comedy, “When You're 30, It Will Be Okay” after reading her proposal.
 Gong Myung as Chu Jae-hoon
A new employee in Han-joo's marketing team. He has a complicated relationship with his girlfriend Ha-Yoon.

Supporting

People around Jin-joo
 Lee You-jin as Kim Hwan-dong
Lim Jin-joo's ex-boyfriend and Son Beom-soo's assistant director.
 Baek Ji-won as Jeong Hye-jeong
 Jin-joo's former boss. She is a famous screenwriter in the industry.
 Baek Soo-hee as Lim Ji-yeon
 Jin-joo's younger sister.
 Kang Ae-shim
 Jin-joo’s mother
 Seo Sang-won
 Jin-joo’s father

People around Eun-jung
 Yoon Ji-on as Lee Hyo-bong
Eun-jung's younger brother. A drama producer who is close with the three best friends. He is in a relationship with another male producer.
 Han Joon-woo as Hong-dae
Eun-jung's deceased boyfriend. He often appears in her imagination.
 Lee Joo-bin as Lee So-min
She's a top celebrity and Eun-jung's rival. They used to be friends before So-min became famous.
 Ryu Abell as Kim Ah-rang
A documentary director and Eun-jung's friend.
 Park Hyung-soo as President So
President of documentary group.

People around Han-joo
 Seol Woo-Hyung as Hwang In-kook
Han-joo and Seung-hyo's son. He sometimes struggles with not having his father around.
 Kim Young-ah as Lee So-jin
CEO of the drama production company where Han-joo works.
 Lee Hak-joo as Noh Seung-hyo
Han-joo's ex-husband and In-kook's father. He seduced Han-joo when she was a college student and left her because he wasn't satisfied with his life.

People around Beom-soo
 Jung Seung-kil as Seong In-jong
Director of the broadcasting company JBC where Beom-soo works.
 Heo Joon-seok as Dong-gi
Beom-soo's co-worker and friend. He often fails in giving Beom-soo good advice.
 Lee Ji-min as Da-mi
She works at JBC's cafeteria and confessed her love to Beom-soo.
 Nam Young-joo as Sol-bi
Beom-soo's ex-girlfriend. She's a lyricist who sometimes works with Hyo-bong.

Others
 Kim Myung-joon as Lee Min-joon
So-min's manager. He is very dedicated to her and seems to have a crush on her.
 Mi Ram as Ha-yoon
Jae-hoon's on-again off-again girlfriend.
 Song Duk-ho as Chu Jae-hoon's friend	
He and Chu are friends.

Special appearances
 Jin Seon-kyu as actor (Ep. 1)
 Lee Hanee as actress (Ep. 1)
 Kim Do-yeon as herself (Ep. 2–3)
 Weki Meki as themselves (Ep. 3)
 Yang Hyun-min as actor (Ep. 4, 6)
 Son Suk-ku as Kim Sang-soo (Ep. 10, 12–16)
 Jung So-min as Seon-joo (Ep. 16)

Production
Lee Byeong-heon, who co-wrote and co-directed the series, started working on it in 2015 after the release of his coming-of-age film Twenty. He stated that he "wanted to discuss the stories of people, not just women, who were starting anew after coming out of relationships. This story was too much to spin in two hours so [he] opted for a drama format."

The early working title of the series is Yeouido Scandal (여의도 스캔들) . It was originally planned to air
on cable channel tvN in 2017 following A Korean Odyssey, however, it did not push through.

The first script reading took place on March 13, 2019 in Sangam-dong, Seoul, South Korea.

On July 12, 2019, actor Oh Seung-yoon, who had been cast for the role of Lee Hyo-bong, was removed from the drama after being booked for aiding and abetting drunk driving. As the crew needed to reshoot all his scenes from episode 1 to 14, the premiere was delayed by two weeks, from July 26 to August 9. On July 19, it was confirmed that Oh Seung-yoon had been replaced by Yoon Ji-on.

Original soundtrack

Part 1

Part 2

Part 3

Part 4

Part 5

Part 6

Part 7

Part 8

Ratings

Awards and nominations

References

External links
  
  
 

JTBC television dramas
Korean-language television shows
2019 South Korean television series debuts
2019 South Korean television series endings
South Korean romantic comedy television series
South Korean LGBT-related television shows
Television series by Samhwa Networks